Astragalus douglasii is a species of milkvetch known by the common name Douglas's milkvetch. It is native to California and Baja California, where it can be found in many types of desert, valley, chaparral and woodlands, and montane habitats, usually below  elevation.

Description
Astragalus douglasii is a bushy perennial herb producing a number of erect or prostrate stems up to a meter long. The abundant leaves are up to 18 centimeters long and are made up of oval-shaped leaflets. The open inflorescence holds up to 30 whitish to pale yellow flowers, each about a centimeter long. The calyx is green with  lobes.

The fruit is an inflated legume pod up to 6 centimeters long and 3 wide which dries to a thin, papery texture.

Varieties
There are three varieties of Astragalus douglasii:
A. d. var. douglasii – limited to California
A. d. var. parishii (Parish's milkvetch) – found throughout the mountain ranges of Southern California
A. d. var. perstrictus (Jacumba milkvetch) – rare variety limited to San Diego County, California, and northern Baja California

References

External links

Astragalus douglasii – Photo gallery

douglasii
Flora of Baja California
Flora of California
Flora of the Sierra Nevada (United States)
Flora of the California desert regions
Flora without expected TNC conservation status